The Sylvania is a historic apartment building located at Indianapolis, Indiana.  It was built in 1906, and consists of two three-story, detached glazed brick and grey limestone buildings. It features Renaissance Revival style door and window surrounds and Classical Revival style design elements.

It was listed on the National Register of Historic Places in 1983.

References

Apartment buildings in Indiana
Residential buildings on the National Register of Historic Places in Indiana
Renaissance Revival architecture in Indiana
Neoclassical architecture in Indiana
Residential buildings completed in 1906
Residential buildings in Indianapolis
National Register of Historic Places in Indianapolis
1906 establishments in Indiana